Cincinnati Public Schools (often abbreviated CPS) is the U.S. state of Ohio's third-largest public school district, by enrollment, after Columbus City Schools and Cleveland Metropolitan School District. Cincinnati Public Schools is the largest Ohio school district rated as 'effective'. Founded in 1829 as the Common Schools of Cincinnati, it is governed by the Cincinnati Board of Education.

History
Hiram S. Gilmore established what became known as Gilmore High School in 1844 for African American students in Cincinnati. Public high schools including Gaines High School administered by a "colored" school board followed but were the subject of litigation.

Geography
The Cincinnati Public School District covers an area of 91 square miles including all of the City of Cincinnati, Amberley Village, Cheviot and Golf Manor; most of the City of Silverton; parts of Fairfax and Wyoming; and small parts of Anderson, Columbia, Delhi, Green, Springfield and Sycamore townships.

Schools
Cincinnati Public Schools operates 62 schools, including 14 high schools, 44 elementary schools, and 4 combined K-12 schools:

Secondary and K–12 schools

Aiken New Tech High School (7–12)
Cincinnati Digital Academy (7–12)
Clark Montessori High School (7–12)
Gilbert A. Dater High School (7–12)
James N. Gamble Montessori High School (7–12)
Hughes STEM High School (7–12)
Lighthouse School (7–12)
Oyler School (Preschool–12)
Riverview East Academy (Preschool–12)
School for Creative and Performing Arts (SCPA) (K–12)
Shroder High School (7–12)
Spencer Center for Gifted and Exceptional Students (3–12)
Robert A. Taft Information Technology High School (7–12)
Virtual High School (7–12)
Walnut Hills High School (7–12)
Western Hills University High School (7–12)
Withrow University High School (7–12)
Woodward Career Technical High School (7–12)

Elementary schools

Academy of Multilingual Immersion Studies (Preschool–8)
Academy of World Languages (Preschool–8)
Bond Hill Academy (Preschool–6)
Carson School (Preschool–6)
Chase School (Preschool–6)
Cheviot School (Preschool–6)
Clifton Area Neighborhood School (Preschool–4)
College Hill Fundamental Academy (Preschool–6)
Covedale School (K–6)
Dater Montessori School (Preschool–6)
Ethel M. Taylor Academy (Preschool–6)
Evanston Academy (Preschool–6)
Fairview-Clifton German Language School (Preschool–6)
Frederick Douglass School (Preschool–6)
Hartwell School (Preschool–8)
Hays-Porter School (Preschool–6)
Hyde Park School (K–6)
James N. Gamble Montessori Elementary School (Preschool–6)
John P. Parker School (Preschool–6)
Kilgour School (K–6)
LEAP Academy (Preschool–4)
Midway School (Preschool–6)
Mt. Airy School (Preschool–6)
Mt. Washington School (Preschool–6)
North Avondale Montessori School (Preschool–6)
Parker Woods Montessori School (Preschool–6)
Pleasant Hill Academy (Preschool–6)
Pleasant Ridge Montessori School (Preschool–6)
Rees E. Price Academy (Preschool–6)
Rising Stars at Carthage (Preschool–1)
Roberts Academy (Preschool–8)
Roll Hill Academy (Preschool–6)
Roselawn Condon School (Preschool–8)
Rothenberg Preparatory Academy (Preschool–6)
Sands Montessori School (Preschool–6)
Sayler Park School (Preschool–8)
Silverton Paideia Academy (Preschool–6)
South Avondale School (Preschool–6)
Westwood School (Preschool–6)
William H. Taft School (Preschool–6)
Winton Hills Academy (Preschool–6)
Woodford Academy (Preschool–6)

Satellite schools
Hospital/Satellite Program Office (9–12)
Juvenile Detention Center (9–12)
The Promise Center (4–6)
The Promise Center— High School (9–12)

See also

List of high schools in Cincinnati, Ohio

References

External links

District Website

 
Education in Hamilton County, Ohio
Educational institutions established in 1829
School districts in Ohio
Montessori schools in the United States
1829 establishments in Ohio